Ijuw is a district in the country of Nauru, located in the northeast of the island. The area covers 1.1 km² and has a population of 180, making Ijuw the least populated district in the country.

Geography
Ijuw borders Anabar District to the north and Anibare District to the south. It is a part of the Anabar Constituency. Cape Ijuw is the northernmost point of Anibare Bay, and the easternmost point of Nauru. Two former villages, Ijuw and Ganokoro, are located within the district.

See also
Ijuh
Anibare Bay#Physical features
List of settlements in Nauru

References

External links

Districts of Nauru
Populated places in Nauru